The Southeastern Conference Academic Consortium in Birmingham, Alabama is a program initiated by the Southeastern Conference for its member institutions to collaborate on academic and scholastic efforts. The consortium was established in 2005 in Fayetteville, Arkansas.

References

Southeastern Conference
Buildings and structures in Birmingham, Alabama